Jaime Arango (born 11 January 1962) is a retired Colombian football striker.

References

1962 births
Living people
Colombian footballers
Independiente Medellín footballers
Once Caldas footballers
Atlético Nacional footballers
Envigado F.C. players
Association football forwards
Colombia international footballers
Footballers from Medellín
20th-century Colombian people